Antal Nagy may refer to:
Antal Nagy (footballer born 1944), Hungarian footballer who played in the 1966 FIFA World Cup
Antal Nagy (footballer born 1956), Hungarian footballer who played in the 1986 FIFA World Cup
Antal Nagy de Buda, petty nobleman from Kolozs county, Kingdom of Hungary